Zholobok is a village in Sievierodonetsk Raion (district) in Luhansk Oblast of eastern Ukraine, at about 40.0 km WNW from the centre of Luhansk.

The settlement was taken under control of pro-Russian forces during the War in Donbass, that started in mid-April 2014.

Demographics
In 2001 the settlement had 153 inhabitants. Native language as of the Ukrainian Census of 2001:
Ukrainian — 89.54%
Russian — 9.8%
Other languages — 0.66%

References

Villages in Sievierodonetsk Raion